The 1983 Canarian Island Cabildo elections were held on Sunday, 8 May 1983, to elect the 2nd Island Cabildos of El Hierro, Fuerteventura, Gran Canaria, La Gomera, La Palma, Lanzarote and Tenerife. All 137 seats in the seven Island Cabildos were up for election. The elections were held simultaneously with regional elections in thirteen autonomous communities and local elections all throughout Spain.

Overall

Island Cabildo control
The following table lists party control in the Island Cabildos. Gains for a party are displayed with the cell's background shaded in that party's colour.

Islands

El Hierro

Fuerteventura

Gran Canaria

La Gomera

La Palma

Lanzarote

Tenerife

See also
1983 Canarian regional election
Results breakdown of the 1983 Spanish local elections (Canary Islands)

References

Canary Islands
1983